The Brazilian Republic Anthem, also known as the Anthem of the Proclamation of the Republic (Portuguese: Hino da Proclamação da República), is a Brazilian song commemorating the Proclamation of the Republic in 15 November 1889. It was composed by Leopoldo Miguez with lyrics by Medeiros e Albuquerque. It was published in an official document on 21 January 1890.

Lyrics

In popular culture
In 1989, a samba school from Rio de Janeiro, GRES Imperatriz Leopoldinense won the Rio Carnival contest with the samba-enredo "Liberdade, Liberdade, abre as asas sobre nós!", an homage to the Chorus of this anthem.

See also

 Brazilian National Anthem
 Brazilian Flag Anthem
 Brazilian Anthem of Independence

Notes

References

External links
 Brazilian National Symbols
 Public Domain - Digital Library - Anthem in mp3

Brazilian anthems
Portuguese-language songs
Historical national anthems
1890 songs